Holy Bagel is an Israeli restaurant chain which sells bagel sandwiches, salads, and other light fare.

History
Holy Bagel was founded in 1999 in Jerusalem as an American style bagel store, by Ari Dubin and Zev Wernick. Both had previously worked in the restaurant business within Israel, and knew they could utilize their experience to tap into the bagel market. Their paths first crossed when they both were working at Bonkers Bagels in Jerusalem, next door to where they opened their first store. Both had previously made Aliyah from the United States.

In 2002 Holy Bagel opened an additional location on Jaffa Road when Dunkin' Donuts Israel closed in that location. Later their business at this location dropped by over 50% due to the Sbarro restaurant suicide bombing.

Holy Bagel later expanded adding locations in Ramot, Geula Jerusalem Central Bus Station, the Old City and beyond Jerusalem in Beit Shemesh, Modi'in, Ra'anana & Netanya

Locations
As of November 2016 Holy Bagel has 9 locations around Israel. All of the locations are franchises.

Holy Bagel runs a catering business which offers service throughout the country, for parties of 60 or more.

Holy Bagel's main factory is located in Talpiot, Jerusalem.

Kashrut
All Holy Bagel locations are kosher Mehadrin.

See also

 Culture of Israel
 Israeli cuisine
 Economy of Israel
 List of restaurants in Israel

References

Restaurant chains in Israel
Bagel companies
1999 establishments in Israel
Bakeries of Israel
Israeli companies established in 1999
Food and drink companies established in 1999